The 2010–11 season was Real Madrid Club de Fútbol's 80th season in La Liga. This article shows player statistics and all matches (official and friendly) that the club played during the 2010–11 season.

The rebuilt Madrid under star manager José Mourinho successfully fought on all fronts, going toe to toe with a brilliant Barcelona side which some regard as the greatest team in football history. Ultimately, Madrid finished second in the league, with 92 points and four behind their perennial rivals, defeated them in the Copa del Rey final, and lost to Barça in the Champions League semi-finals, where Real progressed to for the first time since 2002–03. Moreover, from 16 April through 3 May, a rare occurrence happened when, for the first time ever, four Clásicos were to be played in a span of just 18 days. The first fixture was in the league campaign on 16 April (which ended 1–1 with penalty goals for both sides), the second one was in the Copa del Rey final (which was won by Madrid 1–0 a.e.t., bringing them their first trophy in the second Galáctico era) on 20 April and the third and fourth ones in the two-legged Champions League semi-finals on 27 April and 3 May (Barcelona won on aggregate with a 2–0 away victory and a 1–1 home draw). The matches in the Champions League proved the most controversial, as multiple refereeing decisions were harshly criticized by Mourinho and Madrid players who accused UEFA of favoring the Catalan side. Namely, Pepe's red card in the 61st minute of the first leg was questioned, after which Barcelona scored two goals, with Mourinho being ejected and subsequently banned for the second leg for protesting, and several controversial offside calls were made, as well as Real having a goal disallowed in the second leg, when the score was tied 0–0. Madrid again became the highest scoring team in La Liga, with 102 goals, repeating its output from the previous season, with Cristiano Ronaldo scoring a record 40 and winning the European Golden Shoe.

This season was the first since 1993–94 without Raúl, who departed to join Schalke 04 after his contract was terminated, having stayed at the club for sixteen years.

Club

Coaching staff

Kit

|
|
|

Other information

Players

Squad information

 |
 
 

  |

Transfers

In

Total spending:  €74.5 million

Out

 
Total income:  €16 million, (€5M from Antonio Cassano to Milan transfer)

Long-term injury list

Last updated: 1 April 2011
Source: Realmadrid.com

Pre-season and friendlies

Last updated: 24 May 2011
Source: Preseason, US Tour, US & European Tour, Santiago Bernabéu Trophy, Real Madrid in support of Murcia and Lorca

Competitions

La Liga

League table

Results by round

Matches

Last updated: 21 May 2011
Source: realmadrid.com, LFP, La Liga Schedule, La Liga

Copa del Rey

Round of 32

Round of 16

Quarter-finals

Semi-finals

Final

Last updated: 20 April 2011
Source: Sorteo deciseisavos Copa del Rey

UEFA Champions League

Group stage

Knockout phase

Round of 16

Quarter-finals

Semi-finals

Last updated: 3 May 2011
Source: realmadrid.com, Draws, Matches

Statistics

Squad statistics

Goals

Last updated: 21 May 2011
Source: Match reports in Competitive matches

Disciplinary record

.

Start formations

Overall
{|class="wikitable" style="text-align: center;"
|-
!
!Total
!Home 
!Away
!Neutral
|-
|align=left| Games played          || 59 || 29 || 29 || 1
|-
|align=left| Games won             || 44 || 25 || 18 || 1
|-
|align=left| Games drawn           || 9 || 1 || 8 || 0
|-
|align=left| Games lost            || 6 || 3 || 3 || 0
|-
|align=left| Biggest win           || 8–0 vs Levante || 8–0 vs Levante || 4–0 vs Ajax6–2 vs Sevilla || 1–0 vs Barcelona
|-
|align=left| Biggest loss          || 0–5 vs Barcelona || 0–2 vs Barcelona || 0–5 vs Barcelona ||
|-
|align=left| Biggest win (League)  || 7–0 vs Málaga8–1 vs Almería || 7–0 vs Málaga8–1 vs Almería || 6–2 vs Sevilla ||
|-
|align=left| Biggest win (Cup)     || 8–0 vs Levante || 8–0 vs Levante || 1–0 vs Atlético Madrid1–0 vs Sevilla || 1–0 vs Barcelona
|-
|align=left| Biggest win (Europe)  || 4–0 vs Ajax4–0 vs Auxerre4–0 vs Tottenham Hotspur || 4–0 vs Auxerre4–0 vs Tottenham Hotspur || 4–0 vs Ajax ||
|-
|align=left| Biggest loss (League) || 0–5 vs Barcelona || 0–1 vs Sporting Gijón2–3 vs Real Zaragoza || 0–5 vs Barcelona ||
|-
|align=left| Biggest loss (Cup)    || 0–2 vs Levante ||  || 0–2 vs Levante ||
|-
|align=left| Biggest loss (Europe) || 0–2 vs Barcelona || 0–2 vs Barcelona ||  ||
|-
|align=left| Clean sheets          || 30 || 17 || 12 || 1
|-
|align=left| Goals scored          || 148 || 94 || 53 || 1
|-
|align=left| Goals conceded        || 43 || 16 || 27 || 0
|-
|align=left| Goal difference       || +105 || +78 || +26 || +1
|-
|-
|-
|align=left| Yellow cards         || 152 || 65 || 84 || 3
|-
|align=left| Red cards            || 12 || 6 || 5 || 1
|-
|align=left| Most appearances     ||  Iker Casillas (54) || colspan=3|–
|-
|align=left| Most minutes played  ||  Iker Casillas (5029) || colspan=3|–
|-
|align=left| Top scorer           ||  Cristiano Ronaldo (53) || colspan=3|–
|-
|align=left| Top assistor         ||  Mesut Özil (25) || colspan=3|–
|-
|align=left| Points               || 138/174 (79.31%) || 73/84 (86.9%) || 62/87 (71.26%) || 3/3 (100%)
|-
|align=left| Winning rate         || 74.58% || 86.21% || 62.07% || 100%
|-

See also
2010–11 La Liga
2010–11 Copa del Rey
2010–11 UEFA Champions League

References

External links

Real Madrid Team Page 
 Real Madrid (Spain) profile

Real Madrid
Real Madrid CF seasons
Real Madrid